Jersey Athletic Club, or Jersey A.C., was a U.S. soccer team which competed in the National Association Football League, winning two championships.

History
In 1907, Jersey A.C., which had long fielded a successful cricket team entered a soccer team in the National Association Football League (NAFBL).  They finished mid-table and withdrew at the end of the season.  In 1908, Jersey A.C. returned to the NAFBL.  In 1911, they won their second title.  The team finished mid-table most seasons.  With the entry of the United States into World War I, Jersey A.C. lost so many players to military service that it left the NAFBL in 1918 and ceased operations a year later.

Year-by-year

Honors
League Championship
 Winner (2): 1911, 1917
 Runner Up (2): 1910, 1915

New Jersey State Challenge Cup
 Runner Up (1): 1917

References

External links
 National Association Football League standings

Defunct soccer clubs in New Jersey
National Association Football League teams
1919 disestablishments in New Jersey
1907 establishments in New Jersey
Association football clubs established in 1907
Association football clubs disestablished in 1919